Kacharasahi is a village in Jajpur district in the Indian state of Odisha.

References

Villages in Jajpur district